Brookesia exarmata, also known as the dwarf chameleon, is a species of chameleon  endemic to Madagascar. It was first described by Schimmenti and Jesu in 1996, and the International Union for Conservation of Nature (IUCN) has classed it as an endangered species of animal.

Distribution and habitat
Brookesia exarmata is endemic to Madagascar, where it is only found in its type localities, which is the River Ambodyreana, Tsingy de Bemaraha Strict Nature Reserve, in west-central Madagascar. It is found in a protected area. The IUCN has classed B. exarmata as an endangered species.

Description
The dwarf chameleon is one of the smallest species in the chameleon genus Brookesia. It has a narrow head, and is coloured beige and brown. When threatened, it will stiffen its body and clutch its legs, and then fall to the ground, until it feels safe.

Taxonomy
Brookesia exarmata was first described in 1996 by Schimmenti and Jesu, and was described twice since that year; by Necas in 1999: 277, and most recently, by Townsend et al. in 2009. It is commonly known as the Dwarf Chameleon due to its small size.

References

E
Endemic fauna of Madagascar
Reptiles of Madagascar
Endangered fauna of Africa
Reptiles described in 1996